Osøren Station was a railway station located in Osøyro in Hordaland, Norway. The station was the terminus of Nesttun–Osbanen from the opening on 1 June 1884 to the closure on 2 September 1935. After the railway closed, the station environment has been kept as a heritage railway centre.

Railway stations in Vestland
Railway stations opened in 1884
Railway stations closed in 1935
Disused railway stations in Norway
Os, Hordaland
1884 establishments in Norway
1935 disestablishments in Norway